Jean Roze is a traditional textile producer in Saint-Avertin, Indre-et-Loire, France founded in 1470.
The workshop specializes in the manufacture of silks for high-end furnishings. It is one of the oldest silks in France still in operation. 

Exports represent the majority of the company's turnover. Jean Roze exports to Europe, United States, United Arab Emirates and Russia. Prestigious places are on the list of their clients, such as Oman, Buckingham Palace in London, or the Castle of Villandry.

See also 
List of oldest companies

References 
Article contains text translated from Jean Roze on French Wikipedia retrieved on 25 February 2017.

External links 
Homepage
Location on Google Maps

Textile industry of France
Companies established in the 15th century
15th-century establishments in France